The State Library of Ohio was created in 1817 as a service to the government of the state. Over the years, the State Library has increased its scope to include service to all residents of the state. The position of State Librarian of Ohio was created with the creation of the first State Library of Ohio in 1821. In the early days of the state library, the position was a political 'reward' given by the Governor or legislature. An illustration of that is the fact that the position of changed twice between two men from 1896 to 1921. During the administration of a Democratic Governor, John Newman held the position. Then, when a Republican Governor was elected Charles Galbreath held the job. The first professional librarian was not appointed until 1921. Today, the post is held by a trained librarian who is responsible for the overall management of the State Library.

The first State Librarian was John Harper, appointed by Governor Worthington. The governor had purchased 509 books to be used as a resource for the Ohio State Legislature. Mr. Harper was paid $2.00 per day for each day the legislature was in session. The second librarian was appointed by a senator in 1820. In 1823 the Ohio legislature passed a law defining the term of state librarian as three years with an annual salary of $200.

An outcome of the Ohio Constitutional Convention of 1851 was that the appointment of state librarian was returned to the Governor, though appointment was subject to consent of the Ohio State Senate. The salary was increased to $10,000 and length of term changed to 2 years. A Board of Library Commissioners, consisting of the Governor, Secretary of State, and the State Librarian, was created by the Ohio General Assembly in 1858.

In 1921 the State Library became a division of the Department of Education with a five-member board overseeing policies of the library and the appointment of the State Librarian. Four members of the board were appointed by the Governor and the Director of Education would be the fifth member. The State Librarian was the board's secretary.

List

References

State Librarians of Ohio
State Librarians of Ohio